Ehui is a surname. Notable people with the surname include:

Georges Ehui (born 1994), Ivorian-born English football midfielder 
Ismael Ehui (born 1986), French footballer